R. Dhandayudham (b. 1939 - d. ?) was a Tamil scholar, writer, critic and translator from Tamil Nadu, India.

Biography
Dhandyudham was a senior lecturer in the Indology department of University of Malaya, Malaysia. He has published a number of critical and research works on Tamil literature and a few works of fiction as well. His critical works are in the curriculum of Tamil Virtual University and Bharathidasan University. In 1975, he was awarded the Sahitya Akademi Award for Tamil for his literary criticism Tharkaala Tamil Illakkiyam (lit. Modern Tamil literature). A literary organisation (Doctor Dhandayudham Ilakkiya Peravai) has been established in his memory in Malaysia.

Partial bibliography

Non-fiction
 Tharkaala Tamil Illakkiyam
 Malaysia Tamil ilakkiya varalaaru
 A study of the sociological novels in Tamil
 Aalaya vazhipattil Tamil
 A survey of modern Tamil literature,

Fiction
 Malarum Malar
 Poyyana nyayangal

References

Further reading
 Ninratupōl ninranaiyē neṭuntūram cenranaiyē (Dhandayudham commemoration volume) by V. Selvaraj

1939 births
20th-century Indian translators
Recipients of the Sahitya Akademi Award in Tamil
Tamil writers
Year of death missing
Indian Tamil people
Writers from Tamil Nadu